Ashura is a day of commemoration in Islam. It occurs annually on the 10th of Muharram, the first month of the Islamic calendar. Among Shia Muslims, Ashura is observed through large demonstrations of high-scale mourning as it marks the death of Husayn ibn Ali (a grandson of Muhammad), who was beheaded during the Battle of Karbala in 680 CE. Among Sunni Muslims, Ashura is observed through celebratory fasting as it marks the day of salvation for Moses and the Israelites, who successfully escaped from Biblical Egypt (where they were enslaved and persecuted) after Moses called upon God's power to part the Red Sea. While Husayn's death is also regarded as a great tragedy by Sunnis, open displays of mourning are either discouraged or outright prohibited, depending on the specific act.

In Shia communities, Ashura observances are typically carried out in group processions and are accompanied by a variety of rituals ranging from weeping and shrine pilgrimages to the more controversial acts of self-flagellation and chest-beating. In Sunni communities, there are three rounds of fasting, based on Muhammad's hadith: on the day before Ashura, on the day of Ashura, and on the day after Ashura; while fasting for Ashura is not obligatory, it is strongly encouraged. In folk traditions across countries such as Morocco and Algeria, the day of Ashura is variously celebrated with special foods, bonfires, or carnivals, though these practices are not supported by religious authorities. Due to the drastically differing methods of observance between Sunnis and Shias, the day of Ashura has come to acquire a political dimension in some Islamic countries, and particularly in Iran, where Shia Islam is the official state religion. Additionally, it has also served as a trigger for controversy as well as violent incidents between the two communities in countries such as Iraq and Pakistan.

Etymology
The root of the word Ashura means tenth in Semitic languages; hence the name, literally translated, means "the tenth day". According to the Islamicist A.J. Wensinck, the name is derived from the Hebrew ʿāsōr, with the Aramaic determinative ending.

Origin

Sunni Islam 
Fasting on Ashura, the tenth day of the Islamic month of Muharram was a practice established by Muhammad in the early days of Islam that commemorates the parting of the Red Sea by Moses. Its beginning is recounted in a sahih hadith recorded through Ibn Abbas by al-Bukhari:

When the Prophet (ﷺ) came to Medina, he found (the Jews) fasting on the day of 'Ashura' (i.e. 10th of Muharram). They used to say: "This is a great day on which Allah saved Moses and drowned the folk of Pharaoh. Moses observed the fast on this day, as a sign of gratitude to Allah." The Prophet (ﷺ) said, "I am closer to Moses than they." So, he observed the fast (on that day) and ordered the Muslims to fast on it.

This has been analysed as reflecting an encounter between Muhammad and some Jews fasting for Yom Kippur, on the tenth day of Tishri, in commemoration of Moses, upon which he began to fast on that day and instruct fellow Muslims to fast. The practice would thus have been established at a time when the Islamic and Jewish calendars were synced. However, Muhammad later received a revelation to adjust the Islamic calendar, in the verse of Nasi', and with this Ramadan, the ninth month, became the month of fasting, and the obligation to fast on Ashura was dropped, as Ashura became distinct from its Jewish predecessor of Yōm Kippur. According to a sahih hadith narrated through Aisha:

During the Pre-lslamic Period of ignorance the Quraish used to observe fasting on the day of 'Ashura', and the Prophet (ﷺ) himself used to observe fasting on it too. But when he came to Medina, he fasted on that day and ordered the Muslims to fast on it. When (the order of compulsory fasting in) Ramadan was revealed, fasting in Ramadan became an obligation, and fasting on 'Ashura' was given up, and who ever wished to fast (on it) did so, and whoever did not wish to fast on it, did not fast.

It is still widely considered desirable (mustahab) to fast on Ashura (10th day), and also on Tasua (9th day). With hadith in Jami At-Tirmidhi signifying that God forgives the sins of the year prior for people fasting Ashura.

Shia Islam

Martyrdom of Ḥusayn 

The Battle of Karbala took place during the period of decay resulting from the succession of Yazid I. Immediately after his succession, Yazid instructed the governor of Medina to compel Ḥusayn and a few other prominent figures to pledge their allegiance (Bay'ah). However, Ḥusayn refused to do this, believing that Yazid was going against the teachings of Islam and changing the sunnah of Muhammad. So, accompanied by his household, his sons, brothers, and the sons of Hasan, he left Medina to seek asylum in Mecca.

In Mecca, Ḥusayn learned that Yazid had sent assassins to kill him during the Hajj. To preserve the sanctity of the city and of the Kaaba, Husayn abandoned his Hajj and encouraged his companions to follow him to Kufa without realising that the situation there had taken an adverse turn.

On the way there, Ḥusayn found that his messenger, Muslim ibn Aqeel, had been killed in Kufa and encountered the vanguard of the army of Ubaydullah ibn Ziyad. Ḥe addressed the Kufan army, reminding them that they had invited him to come there because they were without an Imam, and told them that he intended to proceed to Kufa with their support; however, if they were now opposed to his coming, he would return to Mecca. When the army urged him to take another route, he turned to the left and reached Karbala, where the army forced him to stop at a location with little water.

Governor Ubaydullah ibn Ziyad instructed Umar ibn Sa'ad, the head of the Kufan army, to again offer Ḥusayn and his supporters the opportunity to swear allegiance to Yazid. He also ordered Umar ibn Sa'ad to cut Ḥusayn and his followers off from access to the water of the Euphrates. The next morning, Umar ibn Sa'ad arranged the Kufan army in battle formation.

The Battle of Karbala lasted from sunrise to sunset on 10 October 680 (Muharram10, 61AH). Husayn's small group of companions and family members (around 72 men plus women and children) fought against Umar ibn Sa'ad's army and were killed near the Euphrates, from which they were not allowed to drink. The renowned historian Abū Rayḥān al-Bīrūnī states:

Once the Umayyad troops had murdered Ḥusayn and his male followers, they looted the tents, stripped the women of their jewellery, and took the skin upon which Zain al-Abidin was prostrate. Ḥusayn's sister Zaynab was taken along with the enslaved women to the king in Damascus where she was imprisoned before being allowed to return to Medina after a year.

Significance 
The first assembly (majlis) of the Commemoration of Ḥusayn ibn ʿAlī is said to have been held by Zaynab in prison. In Damascus she is also reported to have delivered a poignant oration. The prison sentence ended when Husayn's four-year-old daughter, Ruqayyah bint Husayn, who would often cry to be allowed to see her father, died in captivity, probably after seeing his mutilated head. Her death caused an uproar in the city, and, fearing an uprising, Yazid freed the captives.

According to Ignác Goldziher,

Imam Zayn Al Abidin said the following:

Husayn's grave became a pilgrimage site for Shia Muslims within a few years of his death. A tradition of pilgrimage to the shrine of Imam Husayn and the other Karbala martyrs, known as Ziarat ashura, quickly developed. The Umayyad and Abbasid caliphs tried to prevent construction of the shrines and discouraged pilgrimage. The tomb and its annexes were destroyed by the Abbasid caliph Al-Mutawakkil in 850–851 and Shia pilgrimage was prohibited, but shrines in Karbala and Najaf were built by the Buwayhid emir 'Adud al-Daula in 979–80.

Public rites of remembrance for Husayn's martyrdom developed from the early pilgrimages. Under the Buyid dynasty, Mu'izz ad-Dawla officiated at a public commemoration of Ashura in Baghdad. These commemorations were also encouraged in Egypt by the Fatimid caliph al-'Aziz. With the recognition of the Twelvers as the official religion by the Safavids, the Mourning of Muharram extended throughout the first ten days of Muharram.

Ashura was remembered by Jafaris, Qizilbash Alevi-Turks, and Bektashis during the period of the Ottoman Empire. It is of particular significance to Twelver Shias and Alawites, who consider Husayn (the grandson of Muhammad) Ahl al-Bayt, the third Imam to be the rightful successor of Muhammad.

According to Kamran Scot Aghaie, "The symbols and rituals of Ashura have evolved over time and have meant different things to different people. However, at the core of the symbolism of Ashura is the moral dichotomy between worldly injustice and corruption on the one hand and God-centered justice, piety, sacrifice and perseverance on the other. Also, Shiite Muslims consider the remembrance of the tragic events of Ashura to be an important way of worshipping God in a spiritual or mystical way."

Shia Muslims make pilgrimages on Ashura, as they do forty days later on ʾArbaʿīn, to the Mashhad al-Husayn, the shrine in Karbala, Iraq, that is traditionally held to be Husayn's tomb. This is a day of remembrance, and mourning attire is worn. This is a time for sorrow and for showing respect for the person's passing, and it is also a time for self-reflection when a believer commits themself completely to the mourning of Husayn. Shia Muslims refrain from listening to or playing music since Arabic culture generally considers playing music during death rituals to be impolite. Nor do they plan weddings or parties on this date. Instead they mourn by crying and listening to recollections of the tragedy and sermons on how Husayn and his family were martyred. This is intended to connect them with Husayn's suffering and martyrdom, and the sacrifices he made to keep Islam alive. Husayn's martyrdom is widely interpreted by Shia Muslims as a symbol of the struggle against injustice, tyranny, and oppression. Shia Muslims believe the Battle of Karbala was between the forces of good and evil, with Husayn representing good and Yazid representing evil.

Shia imams insist that Ashura should not be celebrated as a day of joy and festivity. According to the Eighth Shia Imam Ali al-Rida, it must be observed as a day of rest, sorrow, and total disregard of worldly matters.

Some of the events associated with Ashura are held in special congregation halls known as "Imambargah" and Hussainia.

The World Sunni Movement celebrates this day as the National Martyrs' Day of the Muslim nation under the direction of Syed Imam Hayat.

Remembrance

Azadari (mourning) rituals 

The words Azadari (Persian: عزاداری), which means mourning and lamentation, and Majalis-e Aza are used exclusively in connection with the remembrance ceremonies for the martyrdom of Imam Hussain. Majalis-e Aza, also known as Aza-e Husayn, includes mourning congregations, lamentations, matam and all acts which express the grief and, above all, repulsion against what Yazid stood for.

These customs show solidarity with Husayn and his family. Through them, people mourn Husayn's death and express regret for the fact that they were not present at the battle to save Husayn and his family.

Tuwairij run 
The Tuwairij run is the name of an Ashura ceremony in which millions of people from around Tuwairij in 22 km run and mourning on side of the Imam Husayn Shrine. this ceremony is considered as the biggest observance of religious activities in the world. Its importance has grown since Moḥammad Mahdī Baḥr al-ʿUlūm was quoted as saying that Hujjat bin Hasan was present at this ceremony.

History 
The Tuwairij was first run on Ashura 1855 when people who were at the house of Seyyed Saleh Qazvini after the mourning ceremony and the recitation of the murder of Husain bin ‘Ali cried so much from grief and sorrow that they asked Seyyed Saleh to run to the imam's shrine to offer his condolences. Seyyed Saleh accepted their request and went to the shrine with all the mourners.

Prohibition of the march 

The march was banned by Saddam Hussein’s Ba‘athist regime between 1991 and 2003. However, despite the ban, Tuwairij still continued and the regime executed many participants. The event was permitted again after 2003, and participation from outside Iraq has steadily increased.

Popular customs 

After almost 12 centuries, five main types of rituals were developed around the story of the battle of Karbala. These rituals include memorial services (majalis al-ta'ziya); visits to Husayn's tomb in Karbala particularly on Ashura and on the fortieth day after the battle (Ziyarat Ashura and Ziyarat al-Arba'in);  public mourning processions (al-mawakib al-husayniyya); representation of the battle as a play (the shabih); and personal flagellation (tatbir). Some Shia Muslims believe that taking part in Ashura washes away their sins. A popular Shia saying has it that "a single tear shed for Husayn washes away a hundred sins".

For Shia Muslims, the commemoration of Ashura is an event of intense grief and mourning. Mourners congregate at a mosque for sorrowful, poetic recitations such as marsiya, noha, latmiya, and soaz performed in memory of the martyrdom of Husayn, lamenting and grieving to the tune of beating drums and chants of "Ya Hussain". Ulamas also give sermons on the themes of Husayn's personality and position in Islam, and the history of his uprising. The Sheikh of the mosque retells the story of the Battle of Karbala to allow his listeners to relive the pain and sorrow endured by Husayn and his family and they read Maqtal Al-Husayn. In some places, such as Iran, Iraq, and the Arab states of the Persian Gulf, passion plays known as Ta'zieh are performed, reenacting the Battle of Karbala and the suffering and martyrdom of Husayn at the hands of Yazid.

In the Caribbean islands of Trinidad and Tobago and Jamaica, Ashura, known locally as 'Hussay' or Hosay, may commemorate the grandson of Muhammad, but the celebration has taken on influences from other religions including Roman Catholicism, Hinduism, and the Baptist movement, so that it has become a mixture of different cultures and religion. The event is attended by both Muslims and non-Muslims in an environment of mutual respect and tolerance. For the duration of the memorial events, it is customary for mosques and individuals to provide free meals (Nazri or Votive Food) for everyone on certain nights.

Certain traditional flagellation rituals such as Talwar zani (talwar ka matam or sometimes tatbir) use a sword.  Other rituals, such as zanjeer zani or zanjeer matam, use a zanjeer (a chain with blades). This can be controversial and some Shia clerics have denounced the practice saying "it creates a backward and negative image of their community." Instead believers are encouraged to donate blood for those in need. A few Shia Muslims observe the event by donating blood ("Qame Zani"), and flagellating themselves

Socio-political aspects

Commemoration of Ashura is of great socio-political value to the Shia, who have been a minority throughout their history. According to the prevailing conditions at the time of the commemoration, such reminiscences may become the basis for implicit dissent or even explicit protest. This is what happened, for instance, during the Islamic Revolution in Iran, the Lebanese Civil War, the Lebanese resistance against the Israeli military presence and in the 1990s Uprising in Bahrain. Sometimes Ashura commemorations overtly associate the memory of Al-Husayn's martyrdom with the conditions of modern Islam and Muslims in reference to Husayn's famous quote on the day of Ashura: "Every day is Ashura, every land is Karbala".

From the period of the Iranian Constitutional Revolution (1905–1911) onward, mourning gatherings increasingly took on a political aspect, with preachers comparing the oppressors of the time with Imam Husayn's enemies, the Umayyads.

The political function of the commemorations was very marked in the years leading up to the Islamic Revolution of 1978–79, as well as during the revolution itself. In addition, the implicit self-identification of the Muslim revolutionaries with Imam Husayn led to a blossoming of the cult of the martyr, expressed most vividly, perhaps, in the vast cemetery of Behesht-e Zahra, to the south of Tehran, where the martyrs of the revolution and the war against Iraq are buried.

On the other hand, some governments have banned this commemoration. In the 1930s Reza Shah forbade it in Iran. The regime of Saddam Hussein saw it as a potential threat and banned Ashura commemorations for many years. During the 1884 Hosay massacre, 22 people were killed in Trinidad and Tobago when civilians attempted to carry out the Ashura rites, locally known as Hosay, in defiance of the British colonial authorities.

Terrorist attacks during Ashura
Terrorist attacks against Shia Muslims have occurred in several countries on the day of Ashura, which has produced an "interesting" feedback effect in Shia history.

 1818–1820: Syed Ahmad Barelvi and Shah Ismail Dihlavi took up arms to stop the Ashura commemoration in North India. They were the pioneers of anti-Shia terrorism in the subcontinent. Barbara Metcalf noted:

A second group of abuses Syed Ahmad held were those that originated from Shi’i influence. He particularly urged Muslims to give up the keeping of ta’ziyahs, the replicas of the tombs of the martyrs of Karbala taken in procession during the mourning ceremony of Muharram. Muhammad Isma’il wrote, "a true believer should regard the breaking of a tazia by force to be as virtuous an action as destroying idols. If he cannot break them himself, let him order others to do so. If this even be out of his power, let him at least detest and abhor them with his whole heart and soul". Sayyid Ahmad himself is said, no doubt with considerable exaggeration, to have torn down thousands of imambaras, the building that house the taziyahs.

 1940: Bomb thrown on Ashura Procession in Delhi, 21 February
 1994: explosion of a bomb at the Imam Reza shrine, 20 June, in Mashhad, Iran, 20 people killed
 2004: bomb attacks, during Shia pilgrimage to Karbala, 2 March, Karbala, Iraq, 178 people killed and 5000 injured
 2008: clashes, between Iraqi troops and members of a Shia cult, 19 January, Basra and Nasiriya, Iraq, 263 people killed
 2009: explosion of a bomb, during the Ashura procession, 28 December, Karachi, Pakistan, dozens of people killed and hundreds injured
 2010: detention of 200 Shia Muslims, at a shop house in Sri Gombak known as Hauzah Imam Ali ar-Ridha (Hauzah ArRidha), 15 December, Selangor, Malaysia
 2011: explosion of a bomb, during the Ashura procession, 28 December, Hilla and Baghdad, Iraq, 5 December 30 people killed
 2011: suicide attack, during the Ashura procession, Kabul, Afghanistan, 6 December 63 people killed
 2015: three explosions, during the Ashura procession, mosque in Dhaka, Bangladesh, 24 October, one person killed and 80 people injured

In the Gregorian calendar

While Ashura always takes place on the same day of the Islamic calendar, the date on the Gregorian calendar varies from year to year due to differences between the two calendars, since the Islamic calendar is a lunar calendar and the Gregorian calendar is a solar calendar. Furthermore, the appearance of the crescent moon used to determine when each Islamic month begins varies from country to country due to their different geographic locations.

Gallery

See also 

 Al-Tall Al-Zaynabiyya
 Ashoura (missile)
 Ashura in Algeria
 Ashure
 Battle of Karbala
 Bibi-Ka-Alam
 Day of Tasu'a
 Hobson Jobson
 List of casualties in Husayn's army at the Battle of Karbala
 Mourning of Muharram
 Passover
 Persecution of Shia Muslims
 Sebiba
 Yom Kippur
 Ziyarat Ashura

Notes

References

Citations

Sources 

 Litvak, Meir (1998). Shi'i Scholars of Nineteenth-Century Iraq: The Ulama of Najaf and Karbala. Cambridge University Press. 
 al Musawi, Muhsin (2006). Reading Iraq: Culture and Power and Conflict. I.B. Tauris. 
 al Mufid, al-Shaykh Muhammad (December 1982 (1sted.)). Kitab Al-Irshad. Tahrike Tarsile Quran. 
 al-Azdi, abu Mikhnaf, Maqtal al-Husayn. Shia Ithnasheri Community of Middlesex (PDF)

Further reading

External links 

 Gordon B. Coutts (Scottish/American, 1868–1937) A Large Oil on Canvas Depicting "The Ashura Rituals, Tangier" (Arabic: عاشوراء ʻĀshūrā’ – Urdu: عاشورا – Persian: عاشورا – Turkish: Aşure Günü). Signed and inscribed: 'Gordon Coutts/TANGIER (lower right). c. 1920
 Is Aashura a day of mourning or rejoicing?
 Ashura – The Historical Significance and Rewards on Islam Freedom
 Events on the day of Ashura
 "Ashura" An article in Encyclopædia Britannica Online
 What is Ashura? (BBC News)
 What Is Ashura? – by Abdul-Ilah As-Saadi on Al Jazeera
 Ashura Australia – Official website of the Annual Ashura Procession in Sydney

Shia days of remembrance
Islamic holy days
Mourning of Muharram
Islamic terminology
History of Islam
Family of Muhammad

Hussainiya
Ashura
Sufism in Algeria
Public holidays in Algeria
Festivals in Algeria
History of Shia Islam